Richardménil is a commune in the Meurthe-et-Moselle department in north-eastern France, near Nancy.

Governance
List of mayors

Demography

Patrimony
Richardménil has 2 castles. One is still inhabited, the second one was destroyed during the Second World War

See also
 Communes of the Meurthe-et-Moselle department

References

Communes of Meurthe-et-Moselle